The South West Africa People's Organisation (SWAPO; , SWAVO; , SWAVO), officially known as the SWAPO Party of Namibia, is a political party and former independence movement in Namibia. Founded in 1960, it has been the governing party in Namibia since the country achieved independence in 1990. The party continues to be dominated in number and influence by the Ovambo ethnic group.

SWAPO held a two-thirds majority in parliament from 1994 to 2019. In the general election held in November 2019, the party won 65.5% of the popular vote and 63 out of the 104 seats in the National Assembly. It also holds 28 out of the 42 seats in the National Council. As of November 2017, Namibian President Hage Geingob has been the president of SWAPO after being elected to the position at the party's electoral congress.

History

Background and foundation 
German South West Africa was established in 1884. After World War I, the League of Nations gave South West Africa, formerly a German colony, to the United Kingdom as a mandate under the administration of South Africa. When the National Party won the 1948 election in South Africa and subsequently introduced apartheid legislation, these laws were applied as well to South West Africa. It was considered the de facto fifth province of South Africa.

SWAPO was founded on 19 April 1960 as the successor of the Ovamboland People's Organization. Leaders renamed the party to show that it represented all Namibians. But, the organisation had its base among the Ovambo people of northern Namibia, who constituted nearly half the total population.

Struggle for independence 
During 1962, SWAPO had emerged as the dominant nationalist organisation for the Namibian people. It co-opted other groups such as the South West Africa National Union (SWANU), and later in 1976 the Namibia African People's Democratic Organisation. SWAPO used guerrilla tactics to fight the South African Defence Force. On 26 August 1966, the first major clash of the conflict took place, when a unit of the South African Police, supported by the South African Air Force, exchanged fire with SWAPO forces. This date is generally regarded as the start of what became known in South Africa as the Border War.

One important factor in the fight for independence was the 1971-72 Namibian contract workers strike, which fought for the elimination of the contract labor system and independence from South Africa. An underlying goal was the promotion of independence under SWAPO leadership.

In 1972, the United Nations General Assembly recognised SWAPO as the 'sole legitimate representative' of Namibia's people. The Norwegian government began giving aid directly to SWAPO in 1974.

The country of Angola gained its independence on 11 November 1975 following its war for independence. The leftist Popular Movement for the Liberation of Angola (MPLA), supported by Cuba and the Soviet Union, came to power. In March 1976, the MPLA offered SWAPO bases in Angola for launching attacks against the South African military.

Independent Namibia
When Namibia gained its independence in 1990, SWAPO became the dominant political party. Though the organisation rejected the term South West Africa and preferred to use Namibia, the organisation's original name—derived from the territory's old name—was too deeply rooted in the independence movement to be changed. However, the original full name is no longer used; only the acronym remains. SWAPO, and with it much of Namibia's government and administration, continues to be dominated by the Ovambo ethnic group, despite "considerable efforts to counter [that] perception".

SWAPO president Sam Nujoma was declared Namibia's first President after SWAPO won the inaugural election in 1989. A decade later, Nujoma had the constitution changed so he could run for a third term in 1999, as it limits the presidency to two terms.

In 2004, the SWAPO presidential candidate was Hifikepunye Pohamba, described as Nujoma's hand-picked successor. In 2014, the SWAPO presidential candidate was Hage Geingob, who was the Vice-President of SWAPO. In 2019 presidential election, president Geingob won his second five-year term as Namibian president.

Ideology
SWAPO was founded with the aim of attaining the independence of Namibia and therefore is part of the African nationalist movement. Pre-independence it harboured a socialist, Marxist–Leninist ideology, a thinking that was not immediately abandoned when independence was achieved in 1990 and SWAPO became the ruling party. Officially, however, it adopted a social democratic ideology, until the electoral congress in 2017 approved the official change to socialism with a "Namibian character", although some Namibians have labeled the change as lacking a "grass-roots [socialist]" nature.

Various commentators have characterised the politics of SWAPO in different ways. Gerhard Tötemeyer, himself a party member, considers its post-independence politics neoliberal and social democratic. Henny Seibeb, an opposition politician from the Landless People's Movement, describes the current party ideology as liberal nationalism with traces of "dogmatism, authoritarianism, and statism".

Structure 
The party president is the top position of SWAPO; in 2012 this was held by Namibia's former president Pohamba. The vice-president is Namibia's current president Hage Geingob, who was elected to that position in 2007 and reconfirmed at the SWAPO congress in December 2012. The third highest position in SWAPO is the secretary-general, a position held in December 2012 by Nangolo Mbumba. Number four is the deputy secretary-general, Omaheke governor Laura McLeod-Katjirua.

Like many socialist and communist parties, SWAPO is governed by a politburo and a central committee. The party leadership is advised by a youth league, a women's council, and an elders' council.

Politburo 
The politburo of SWAPO is a body that  consists of:
 The party president: Hage Geingob 
 The former party president: Hifikepunye Pohamba
 The secretary-general: Sophia Shaningwa 
 The deputy secretary-general: Marco Hausiku
 2 members appointed by the party president
 18 members elected by the SWAPO central committee:

 Nangolo Mbumba
 Saara Kuugongelwa-Amadhila
 Laura McLeod-Katjirua
 Pohamba Shifeta
 Peter Katjavivi
 Doreen Sioka
 Katrina Hanse-Himarwa
 Margaret Mensah-Williams
 Sirkka Ausiku
 Lucia Witbooi
 Hilma Nikanor
 Bernard Esau
 Alpheus ǃNaruseb
 Calle Schlettwein
 John Mutorwa
 Albert Kawana
 Lucia Iipumbu
 Tobie Aupindi

Central Committee 

SWAPO's Central Committee consists of:
 The president
 The vice-president
 The secretary-general
 The deputy secretary-general
 The founding president of SWAPO as a permanent member
 13 SWAPO Party regional coordinators
 54 members elected at the party congress
 10 members appointed by the party president

The  members are:
 Hage Geingob (ex officio, SWAPO President)
 Netumbo Nandi-Ndaitwah (ex officio, SWAPO Vice-President)
 Sophia Shaningwa (ex officio, SWAPO Secretary-General)
 Marco Hausiku (ex officio, SWAPO Deputy Secretary-General)
 Sam Nujoma (ex officio SWAPO founding President)
 Hifikepunye Pohamba (ex officio SWAPO former President)

Elected members:

 Nahas Angula
 Abraham Iyambo
 Ben Amathila
 Marco Hausiku
 Nickey Iyambo
 Jerry Ekandjo
 John Mutorwa
 Utoni Nujoma
 Saara Kuugongelwa-Amadhila
 Theo-Ben Gurirab
 Libertine Amathila
 Netumbo Nandi-Ndaitwah
 Pendukeni Iivula-Ithana
 Bernard Esau
 Pohamba Shifeta
 Richard Kamwi
 Petrus Iilonga
 Joel Kaapanda
 Albert Kawana
 David Namwandi
 Isak Katali
 Katrina Hanse-Himarwa
 Erkki Nghimtina
 Tjekero Tweya
 Erastus Uutoni
 Samuel Ankama
 Margaret Mensah-Williams
 Mandume Pohamba
 Doreen Sioka
 Kazenambo Kazenambo
 Helmut Angula
 Peya Mushelenga
 Loide Kasingo
 Alpheus ǃNaruseb
 Peter Katjavivi
 Leon Jooste
 Asser Kapere
 Charles Namoloh
 Lempy Lucas
 Veikko Nekundi
 Hilma Nikanor
 Lucia Witbooi
 Penda Ya Ndakolo
 Usko Nghaamwa
 Immanuel Ngatjizeko
 Eunice Iipinge
 Elia Kaiyamo
 Moses Amweelo
 Sophia Shaningwa
 Samuel Nuuyoma
 Martha Namundjebo-Tilahun
 Rosalia Nghidinwa
 Clemens Kashuupulwa
 Henock Ya Kasita
 Uahekua Herunga
 Willem Konjore

President-appointed members (2017):

 Calle Schlettwein
 Erkki Nghimtina
 Penda Ya Ndokolo
 Christina Hoebes
 Jennely Matundu
 Collien van Wyk

List of presidents 
 Sam Nujoma (1960–2007)
 Hifikepunye Pohamba (2007–2015)
 Hage Geingob (2015–present)

Finances and business interests 
Although SWAPO receives finances from government for its operations, the party also holds extensive business interests. Through Kalahari Holdings, it entered into joint ventures with several companies, most prominently the Namibian branch of MultiChoice, a private satellite TV provider, of which it owns 51%. Kalahari Holdings has further joint ventures with Radio Energy, Africa Online, and businesses in the tourism, farming, security services and health insurance sectors. It owns Namib Contract Haulage, Namprint, Kudu Investments and the Ndilimani Cultural Troupe.

Namibia Today was the mouthpiece of the SWAPO, and Asser Ntinda was its editor. The paper does not appear to have been active since 7 April 2011 and closed down in 2015.

Human rights abuses 
Various groups have claimed that SWAPO committed serious human rights abuses against suspected spies during the independence struggle. Since the early 21st century, they have pressed the government more strongly on this issue. Breaking the Wall of Silence (BWS) is one of the groups founded by people who were detained by SWAPO during the war and abused during interrogations. In 2004, BWS alleged that "In exile, hundreds of SWAPO dependants and members were detained, tortured and killed without trial." SWAPO denies serious infractions and claims anything that did happen was in the name of liberation. Because of a series of successful South African raids, the SWAPO leadership believed that spies existed in the movement. Hundreds of SWAPO cadres were imprisoned, tortured and interrogated.

In 2005, the P.E.A.C.E. Centre (People's Education, Assistance and Counselling for Empowerment) conducted an extensive study on the lives of Namibian ex-fighters and their families fifteen years after Independence. Their published ebook investigates the post-independence lives of those who fought on both sides of the Namibian War of Independence. Data from this research indicate that ex-fighters  exhibit symptoms of long-term post traumatic stress disorder (PTSD). The findings indicate there is a correlation between the life circumstances of ex-fighters and their lack of resilience to traumatic war experiences. Resiliency has been linked to a number of protective factors, such as the socio-economic situation of the survivors, their socio-political environment, their social support networks, and their cognitive processes.

The study says that, in the case of Namibian ex-fighters, long-term psychological distress is different from a simple PTSD diagnosis. The survivors have almost invariably gone for nearly two decades without seeking treatment, adding to their burdens. During this time, the ex-fighters have been exposed to additional social and psychological stressors through life events. For a person without PTSD, such stressors may have fleeting effects, but for a sufferer of long-term psychological distress, each life incident could reduce the survivor's resilience to trauma, as well as triggering "flashbacks" to events during the war.

Memberships 
SWAPO is a full member of Socialist International. It was a member of the Non-Aligned Movement before the independence of Namibia in 1990.

Electoral history

Presidential elections

National Assembly elections

National Council elections

See also 

 People's Liberation Army of Namibia
 Namibia African People's Democratic Organisation
 Popular Movement for the Liberation of Angola
 South African Border War
 South West Africa National Union
 SWAPO for Justice
 Andimba Toivo ya Toivo

References

External links 
 Hoog, Tycho van der (2022). "A New Chapter in Namibian History: Reflections on Archival Research". History in Africa. – An explainer of existing archives on SWAPO.
 Website of SWAPO
 Website of the SWAPO Youth League 
 Reprint of "Namibian Voters Deny Total Power to SWAPO" by Michael Johns, The Wall Street Journal, 19 November 1989.

 
African and Black nationalist organizations in Africa
South West Africa
Guerrilla organizations
Military history of Namibia
Political parties in Namibia
Socialist International
Rebel groups in Namibia
National liberation movements
National liberation armies
Left-wing parties
Anti-Apartheid organisations
1960 establishments in South West Africa
Decolonization